Suncor Energy is a Canadian integrated energy company based in Calgary, Alberta. It specializes in production of synthetic crude from oil sands. In the 2020 Forbes Global 2000, Suncor Energy was ranked as the 48th-largest public company in the world.

Suncor was created by Sun Oil in 1979 as the merger of its Canadian conventional and heavy oil companies, the Sun Oil Company Limited and Great Canadian Oil Sands Limited. Until 2010, Suncor marketed products and services to retail customers in Ontario through a downstream network of 780 company-owned, and 700 customer-operated retail and Diesel fuel sites, primarily in Ontario under the Sunoco brand (owing to Suncor having originally been established as a subsidiary of Sunoco). In 2009, Suncor acquired the former Crown corporation Petro-Canada, which replaced the Sunoco brand across its existing outlets. Suncor also markets through a retail network of Shell and ExxonMobil branded outlets in Colorado.

History

1919–2000
Suncor was founded in 1919 in Montreal as Sun Company of Canada, a subsidiary of Sun Oil (now Sunoco). In 1979, Sun formed Suncor by merging its Canadian refining and retailing interests; Great Canadian Oil Sands (a majority-owned subsidiary, which constructed and operated the first commercial plant to develop Canada's Athabasca oil sands and went on production in 1967); and its conventional oil and gas interests. In 1981, the Government of Ontario purchased a 25% stake in the company; it divested in 1993. In 1995 Sun Oil also divested its interest in the company, although Suncor maintained the Sunoco retail brand in Canada. With these two divestitures, Suncor become an independent, widely held public company.

2000–present
In 2003, Suncor acquired a refinery and associated Phillips 66 gas stations in Commerce City, Colorado from ConocoPhillips. In 2005, Suncor acquired a second Commerce City refinery from Valero Energy. Suncor moved its retail brand from Phillips 66 to Shell from 2009 to 2013. Suncor added the Exxon and Mobil brands in Colorado and Wyoming in 2015.

On March 23, 2009, Suncor announced its intent to acquire Petro-Canada. This merger created a company with a combined market capitalization of C$43.3 billion. On June 4, 2009, a 98% approval rate was reached by Suncor's shareholders for the acquisition of Petro-Canada and the Competition Bureau approved the merger on June 21, 2009. The merger with Canada's 11th largest company was completed on August 1, 2009 in a $21 billion deal to form the second-largest company in Canada (after Royal Bank of Canada) in terms of market capitalization. In December 2009, as a condition of the merger, Suncor sold 98 gas stations in Ontario to Husky Energy, consisting of 68 Sunoco-branded locations and 30 Petro-Canada-branded locations.

In 2015 Suncor courted Canadian Oil Sands, the largest owner of the Syncrude project with 37% ownership (compared with Suncor's 12%), with proposals for acquisition and hostile takeover. In January 2016 they reached an agreement with Suncor acquiring COS for C$6.6 billion, raising its Syncrude ownership to 49%.

On April 27, 2016, Suncor announced that it had reached a $937-million deal to acquire Murphy Oil's five-per-cent stake in the Syncrude project, growing its interest in Syncrude to nearly 54 per cent, making it the majority shareholder of the project. In fall 2021, Suncor assumed operatorship of the Syncrude Joint Venture oil sands project in a bid to improve its performance. Suncor holds a majority stake in Syncrude with 58.74 per cent.

In July 2022, president and CEO Mark Little resigned amid investor pressure and after a series of workplace deaths and safety incidents. Executive vice-president for downstream Kris Smith was named as interim CEO.

On February 21, 2023, Suncor announced that former Imperial Oil Ltd. president and CEO Richard Kruger had been named its new chief executive officer after a months-long search. Kruger will replace interim Suncor CEO Kris Smith on April 3, 2023. Smith will assume the role of chief financial officer and executive vice-president of corporate development after Suncor's annual general meeting on May 9, 2023.

Operations
In North America, Suncor develops and produces oil and natural gas in Western Canada, Colorado, and offshore drilling in eastern Canada. Its international efforts include offshore developments in the North Sea, and conventional, land-based efforts in Libya, Syria, and Trinidad and Tobago.

Suncor operates refineries in Edmonton, Alberta; Sarnia, Ontario; Montreal, Quebec and Commerce City, Colorado. These refineries supply industrial, retail and commercial consumers. The company is also one of the largest Canadian retailers of petroleum products.

Bitumen, oil and natural gas production
Suncor is the world's largest producer of bitumen, and owns and operates an oil sands upgrading plant near Fort McMurray, Alberta, Canada. Originally developed by Great Canadian Oil Sands, a majority-owned subsidiary of Sun Oil, it is now wholly owned by the independent Suncor. It was the first commercial development on the Athabasca oil sands, although small, earlier projects like that at Bitumount also played a role in development. The company held a 36.75% interest in the Joslyn north oil sands project which was shelved pending an economic review by operator Total S.A. in May 2014. The Joslyn project was sold to CNRL in September 2018. The company also produces conventional oil, heavy crude oil, and natural gas.

Refining

In Canada, Suncor operates refineries in Alberta, Ontario and Quebec.  The company's 135,000-barrel-per-day Strathcona, refinery runs entirely on oil sands-based feedstocks and produces a high-yield of light oils. A 137,000-barrel-per-day Montreal Refinery produces gasoline, distillates, asphalts, heavy fuel oil, petrochemicals, solvents and feedstock for lubricants. An 85,000-barrel-per-day refinery in Sarnia, Ontario produces gasoline, kerosene, jet and diesel fuels. A 98,000-barrel-per-day refinery in Commerce City, Colorado produces gasoline, diesel fuel and paving-grade asphalt.

Retail
Suncor's main downstream brand in Canada is Petro-Canada. Suncor previously operated and franchised retail locations under the Sunoco brand, but post-acquisition, nearly all remaining Sunoco stations were converted to Petro-Canada. In addition, the company terminated all of its independent Sunoco franchises, as it planned to implement Petro-Canada's model of requiring franchisees to operate multiple locations. Presently, at least one Sunoco branded station exists, and is located in Port Colborne, Ontario.  A group of affected franchisees filed a class-action lawsuit over the matter, claiming that Suncor had violated Ontario's Arthur Wishart Act. However, the case was blocked by an Ontario court.

In the United States, it operates retail outlets in Colorado under the Shell and Phillips 66 brands.

On April 13, 2012, Suncor paid a $500,000 fine after being found guilty of price-fixing in Ontario.

Aircraft fleet

Suncor Energy owned and operated three Bombardier CRJ900ER aircraft but sold them in late 2016 and now uses Westjet to shuttle Suncor employees to the oilsands.

As of February 2023, Suncor Energy owns a Bombardier Global Express (BD-700) and operate as ICAO airline designator JSN, and telephony JETSUN.

Environmental record
According to a Pollution Watch fact sheet, in 2007 Suncor Energy's oil sands operations had the sixth highest greenhouse gas emissions in Canada. While Suncor has reduced the greenhouse gas emissions intensity of its oil sands operations by more than 50% since 1990, total greenhouse gas emissions from the company's operations have increased because of growing oil sands production.

On April 2, 2009, Suncor was fined $675,000 for failing to install pollution control equipment at its Firebag operation near Fort McMurray, Alberta in July 2006. On the same day, Suncor was fined $175,000 for dumping untreated wastewater from a company work camp near Fort McMurray into the Athabasca River in 2007.

In the United States, Suncor has also been fined by the Colorado Department of Public Health and Environment. In April 2012, a fine of $2.2 million was assessed for air pollution.  Suncor failed to monitor and control emissions a number of times throughout 2009 and 2010, and numerous emissions exceeded regulations. Suncor was also cited for "failure to conduct equipment inspections, train employees, and fully develop standard procedures for operating equipment". Additionally, a benzene leak into Sand Creek was discovered in the fall of 2011.  Employees at Suncor and the nearby Metro Wastewater Reclamation District Plant were exposed to benzene through the air and through drinking water. In April 2018, Suncor and ExxonMobil were sued by the city and county of Boulder, and the county of San Miguel over allegations that they were responsible for climate change in the state. The lawsuit was unique as it was one of the first to be based on these effects on a landlocked area, as opposed to those citing Sea level rise as a factor. In 2020, Suncor reached a US$9 million settlement agreement with authorities in Colorado for more than 100 air pollution violations from its Commerce City refinery.

By 2009, Suncor was working to reduce the amount of bitumen entering tailings ponds. In 2009, under the auspices of the Natural Sciences and Engineering Research Council of Canada (NSERC), Suncor teamed with the University of Alberta and Matrikon, an Edmonton-based software company, to develop separation-cell technology to potentially reduce the amount of bitumen entering tailings ponds by 50 per cent.

By 2009, Suncor operated four wind farms. These wind farms provided 147 megawatts of power, providing an annual  offset of 284,000 tonnes compared to coal-generated electricity. Suncor operates an ethanol facility in St. Clair Township, Ontario. The facility is the largest corn ethanol producer in Canada.

Governance

Chairman of the Board 
Michael M. Koerner, 1982–1984
William R. Loar, 1984–1986
Michael M. Koerner, 1986–1990
Thomas H. Thomson, 1990–1993
Richard L. George, 1993–1994
Robert H. Campbell, 1994–1995
W. Robert Wyman, 1995–2001
James R. Shaw, 2001–2007
John T. Ferguson, 2007–2014
James W. Simpson, 2014–2017
Michael M. Wilson, 2017–

President 
Ross A. Hennigar, 1979–1983 †
William R. Loar, 1983–1985
Thomas H. Thomson, 1985–1991
Richard L. George, 1991–2012
Steven W. Williams, 2012–2018
Mark S. Little, 2018–2022
Kristopher P. Smith (interim), 2022–2023
Richard Kruger, 2023–

† Hennigar was killed in a plane crash on 11 January 1983

See also

 History of the petroleum industry in Canada (oil sands and heavy oil)
 History of the petroleum industry in Canada
 Syncrude
 Canadian petroleum companies
 List of articles about Canadian oil sands

References

External links

 
 Suncor's Official Website
 Petro-Canada's Official Website

Companies listed on the New York Stock Exchange
Companies listed on the Toronto Stock Exchange
Oil companies of Canada
S&P/TSX 60
Companies based in Calgary
Energy companies established in 1919
Gas stations in Canada
Bituminous sands of Canada
Sunoco LP
Non-renewable resource companies established in 1919
1919 establishments in Quebec
Canadian companies established in 1919